The Asa May House (also known as the Rosewood Plantation) is a historic house located along U.S. 19, between U.S. 27 and I-10 in Capps, Florida. The house is closer to US 27 than I-10.

Description and history 
It was added to the National Register of Historic Places on December 15, 1972.

References

External links

Jefferson County markers, Florida's Office of Cultural and Historical Programs

Houses on the National Register of Historic Places in Florida
National Register of Historic Places in Jefferson County, Florida
Houses in Jefferson County, Florida
Historic American Buildings Survey in Florida
1840 establishments in Florida Territory
Greek Revival houses in Florida